Mark Melville Williams (born 21 August 1958) is a former Australian rules football player and coach. As a player, Williams represented  in the South Australian National Football League (SANFL) as well as Collingwood and Brisbane Bears in the Australian Football League (AFL) from the 1980s to the 1990s.

One of several successful father-son combinations in Australian rules football, Williams became a successful coach after finishing his playing career, leading  to their first AFL premiership in 2004.

Playing career

South Australian National Football League (SANFL)

West Adelaide
The son of South Australian football legend Fos Williams, Williams playing career began with ,In the SANFL league, where his father was serving as coach. He represented West Adelaide on 64 occasions for 37 goals.

Port Adelaide (SANFL) 
Williams then moved to the Port Adelaide Football Club In the SANFL league, becoming one of the stars of the SANFL, where he was part of the 1979 and 1980 Premiership sides.

Victorian Football League (VFL)/ Australian Football League (AFL)

Collingwood Football Club (1981–1986)
Williams justified the hype over his recruitment by winning state selection for Victoria as well as the Copeland Trophy. He was named at centre for Collingwood in the 1981 Grand Final against Carlton. Collingwood lost, but Williams was recognised as being among the Magpies' better players on the day. In 1984, Williams led Collingwood's goalkicking, kicking 53 goals for the season. However, he was unavailable for the Preliminary Final due to injury, and Collingwood went down to eventual premiers  by 133 points. Williams remained captain of Collingwood until he left at the end of 1986 after a contract dispute.

Brisbane Bears (1987–1990)
Williams joined the Brisbane Bears, a new club who joined the Victorian Football League (VFL) league in 1987. He was appointed vice-captain to Mark Mickan at the new club. Williams played three and a half seasons from 1987 until 1990 to a total of 66 games for the Bears, before retiring from the Bears midway through the 1990 AFL season.

Return to South Australian National Football League (SANFL)

Port Adelaide (SANFL) (1990–1992)
Williams returned to Port Adelaide, and finished the 1990 season there, before playing a further two seasons. In his two stints at Port Adelaide, Williams played 115 games, kicking 104 goals, and won four premierships. He retired from playing at the end of 1992, with a total of 380 league games to his name. Williams was also part of the 1990 and 1992 Premiership sides.

Coaching career

Glenelg Football Club (1993–1994) 
Williams coached SANFL club Glenelg in 1993 and 1994.

Essendon Football Club (1995–1996) 
Williams joined  AFL club Essendon as an assistant coach under senior coach Kevin Sheedy for the 1995 season and 1996 season.

Port Adelaide Football Club (1997–2010) 
In 1997, Williams joined Port Adelaide as an assistant coach in its inaugural season in the AFL, and in 1999, won the head coaching role as senior coach of Port Adelaide, replacing John Cahill. Port Adelaide under Williams in his first year as senior coach in the 1999 season, finished in seventh place on the ladder making the finals, but were eliminated by the eventual premiers Kangaroos. In the 2000 season, Port Adelaide's on-field performance under Williams dropped en route to a fourteenth-place finish on the ladder with seven wins and fourteen losses. In the 2001 season, Williams guided Port to finish third on the ladder but were eliminated by Hawthorn in the semi-final. After this, Port Adelaide then won the minor premiership three seasons in a row under Williams' reign, firstly in 2002, Port under Williams were eliminated by the eventual premiers Brisbane Lions in the preliminary final, secondly in 2003, Port under Williams lost to eventual runners-up Collingwood in the preliminary final, and lastly in 2004, after failing to reach the Grand Final in either 2002 or 2003, the club under Williams went on to win its first AFL premiership in the 2004 Grand Final against the Brisbane Lions by a margin of forty points. In the 2005 season, Port under Williams finished in eighth place on the ladder with eleven wins, one draw and ten losses and therefore just made the finals. Port under Williams eliminated North Melbourne in the first elimination final in 2005, however Port under Williams were eliminated by Adelaide Crows in the 2005 semi final in a thrashing by 80 points. In the 2006 season, Port under Williams missed out of the finals, when their on-field performance dropped to finish twelve place on the ladder with eight wins and fourteen losses. In the 2007 season, Williams once again coached Port Adelaide to a grand final in the 2007 Grand Final, but Port under Williams  suffered the second worst ever grand final defeat, losing to Geelong by 119 points. In the 2008 season, Port under Williams missed out of the finals, where they finished in thirteenth place on the ladder with seven wins and fifteen losses.  Throughout 2009, Port Adelaide's inconsistent on-field performances continued to focus on Williams' future at the club. Late in the season, following the appointment of Mark Haysman as CEO, and after much conjecture in the media, Williams was offered a new 2-year contract. At the end of the 2009 season, Port under Williams missed out of the finals again for the second straight consecutive year in a row, where Port under Williams finished in tenth place on the ladder with nine wins and thirteen losses. However, in the 2010 season, the Power's record under Williams started getting worse week by week, sitting in thirteenth place on the ladder after Round 14, 2010 with five wins and nine losses. On 9 July 2010, Williams resigned as senior coach of Port Adelaide and coached his final game for Port Adelaide against Collingwood at AAMI Stadium in Round 15, 2010, where Port lost to Collingwood by 26 points. Williams was replaced by assistant coach Matthew Primus as caretaker senior coach for the rest of the 2010 season, who was eventually employed as full-time senior coach.

Greater Western Sydney Giants (2011–2012) 
In November 2010, Williams signed with the Greater Western Sydney Giants as the senior assistant coach under senior coach Kevin Sheedy. In September 2012, Williams informed the club after the last home and away game of the season that he would not be honoring the final season of his contract in 2013.

Richmond Football Club (2013–2016) 
After the completion of the 2012 home and away season, Williams signed with the Richmond Football Club in an assistant coaching role as a development coach working with senior coach Damien Hardwick. In November 2014, Williams was diagnosed with lymphoma. Williams left the Richmond Football Club at the end of the 2016 season, after he was told that his contract would not be renewed due to a clean-out at the club.

Werribee Football Club (2019–2020) 

In September 2018, Williams was announced as new senior coach of Victorian Football League club Werribee on a three-year deal. In his first season at the helm, Williams led Werribee to the VFL finals for the first time since 2015 and its first time as a standalone club in 20 years.

Melbourne Football Club (2020–present) 
In early December 2020, Williams was appointed the new head of development at Melbourne Football Club in an assistant coaching role, replacing the former head of development Matthew Egan and working with senior coach Simon Goodwin. Williams also played a key off-field role in the club's 2021 premiership victory by being part of the club's coaching panel.

Footballing dynasty 

Williams comes from a large and intensely proud footballing dynasty, closely aligned with Port Adelaide.  His father, the late Fos Williams, is often referred to as the father of the Port Adelaide Football Club.  His twin brother Anthony (died 1988) played at SANFL level, while younger brother Stephen played at both SANFL and AFL level and coached Port Adelaide to three SANFL premierships. His sister, Jenny, briefly served as a psychologist with the club. Mark is married to Pauline and they have three sons, PhD Candidate Isaac, Marcus, Louis and two daughters.

Statistics

Playing statistics

|-
|- style="background-color: #EAEAEA"
! scope="row" style="text-align:center" | 1981
|style="text-align:center;"|
| 21 || 25 || 21 || 18 || 388 || 129 || 517 || 62 ||  || 0.8 || 0.7 || 15.5 || 5.2 || 20.7 || 2.5 || 
|-
! scope="row" style="text-align:center" | 1982
|style="text-align:center;"|Collingwood
| 21 || 22 || 22 || 14 || 340 || 130 || 470 || 91 ||  || 1.0 || 0.6 || 15.5 || 5.9 || 21.4 || 4.1 || 
|- style="background-color: #EAEAEA"
! scope="row" style="text-align:center" | 1983
|style="text-align:center;"|
| 21 || 22 || 42 || 22 || 353 || 115 || 468 || 98 ||  || 1.9 || 1.0 || 16.0 || 5.2 || 21.3 || 4.5 || 
|-
! scope="row" style="text-align:center" | 1984
|style="text-align:center;"|
| 21 || 23 || 53 || 31 || 257 || 113 || 370 || 77 ||  || 2.3 || 1.3 || 11.2 || 4.9 || 16.1 || 3.3 || 
|- style="background-color: #EAEAEA"
! scope="row" style="text-align:center" | 1985
|style="text-align:center;"|
| 21 || 22 || 16 || 13 || 341 || 134 || 475 || 83 ||  || 0.7 || 0.6 || 15.5 || 6.1 || 21.6 || 3.8 || 
|-
! scope="row" style="text-align:center" | 1986
|style="text-align:center;"|
| 21 || 21 || 24 || 20 || 269 || 139 || 408 || 95 ||  || 1.1 || 1.0 || 12.8 || 6.6 || 19.4 || 4.5 || 
|- style="background-color: #EAEAEA"
! scope="row" style="text-align:center" | 1987
|style="text-align:center;"|
| 2 || 19 || 27 || 16 || 263 || 133 || 396 || 72 || 46 || 1.4 || 0.8 || 13.8 || 7.0 || 20.8 || 3.8 || 2.4
|-
! scope="row" style="text-align:center" | 1988
|style="text-align:center;"|
| 2 || 14 || 5 || 16 || 218 || 90 || 308 || 50 || 30 || 0.4 || 1.1 || 15.6 || 6.4 || 22.0 || 3.6 || 2.1
|- style="background-color: #EAEAEA"
! scope="row" style="text-align:center" | 1989
|style="text-align:center;"|
| 2 || 22 || 19 || 18 || 310 || 151 || 461 || 84 || 56 || 0.9 || 0.8 || 14.1 || 6.9 || 21.0 || 3.8 || 2.5
|-
! scope="row" style="text-align:center" | 1990
|style="text-align:center;"|
| 2 || 11 || 7 || 11 || 135 || 72 || 207 || 26 || 26 || 0.6 || 1.0 || 12.3 || 6.5 || 18.8 || 2.4 || 2.4
|- class="sortbottom"
! colspan=3| Career
! 201
! 236
! 179
! 2874
! 1206
! 4080
! 738
! 158
! 1.2
! 0.9
! 14.3
! 6.0
! 20.3
! 3.7
! 2.4
|}

Coaching statistics

|- style="background-color: #EAEAEA"
! scope="row" style="text-align:center; font-weight:normal" | 1999
|style="text-align:center;"|
| 23 || 12 || 11 || 0 || 52.2% || 7 || 16
|-
! scope="row" style="text-align:center; font-weight:normal" | 2000
|style="text-align:center;"|
| 22 || 7 || 14 || 1 || 34.1% || 14 || 16
|- style="background-color: #EAEAEA"
! scope="row" style="text-align:center; font-weight:normal" | 2001
|style="text-align:center;"|
| 23 || 15 || 8 || 0 || 66.7% || 3 || 16
|-
! scope="row" style="text-align:center; font-weight:normal" | 2002
|style="text-align:center;"|
| 25 || 19 || 6 || 0 || 76.0% || 1 || 16
|- style="background-color: #EAEAEA"
! scope="row" style="text-align:center; font-weight:normal" | 2003
|style="text-align:center;"|
| 25 || 19 || 6 || 0 || 76.0% || 1 || 16
|-
! scope="row" style="text-align:center; font-weight:normal" | 2004
|style="text-align:center;"|
| 25 || 20 || 5 || 0 || 80.0% || 1 || 16
|- style="background-color: #EAEAEA"
! scope="row" style="text-align:center; font-weight:normal" | 2005
|style="text-align:center;"|
| 24 || 12 || 11 || 1 || 52.1% || 8 || 16
|-
! scope="row" style="text-align:center; font-weight:normal" | 2006
|style="text-align:center;"|
| 22 || 8 || 14 || 0 || 36.4% || 12 || 16
|- style="background-color: #EAEAEA"
! scope="row" style="text-align:center; font-weight:normal" | 2007
|style="text-align:center;"|
| 25 || 17 || 8 || 0 || 68.0% || 2 || 16
|-
! scope="row" style="text-align:center; font-weight:normal" | 2008
|style="text-align:center;"|
| 22 || 7 || 15 || 0 || 31.8% || 13 || 16
|- style="background-color: #EAEAEA"
! scope="row" style="text-align:center; font-weight:normal" | 2009
|style="text-align:center;"|
| 22 || 9 || 13 || 0 || 40.9% || 10 || 16
|-
! scope="row" style="text-align:center; font-weight:normal" | 2010
|style="text-align:center;"|
| 15 || 5 || 10 || 0 || 33.3% || 10 || 16
|- class="sortbottom"
! colspan=2| Career totals
! 273
! 150
! 121
! 2
! 55.3%
! colspan="2"|
|}

See also
1990 SANFL Grand Final

References

External links 
 
 Official Website of the Port Adelaide Magpies Football Club
 Official Website of the Port Adelaide Football Club
 The Power From Port – Unofficial Port Adelaide Power and Magpies Football Clubs Website
 Profile at Australian Football

Port Adelaide Football Club coaches
Port Adelaide Football Club Premiership coaches
Brisbane Bears players
Port Adelaide Football Club (SANFL) players
Port Adelaide Football Club players (all competitions)
West Adelaide Football Club players
Australian rules footballers from Adelaide
Collingwood Football Club players
Copeland Trophy winners
South Australian State of Origin players
All-Australians (1953–1988)
All-Australian coaches
Glenelg Football Club coaches
South Australian Football Hall of Fame inductees
1958 births
Living people
People educated at Immanuel College, Adelaide
Mark
One-time VFL/AFL Premiership coaches